Eugen von Philippovich (1858–1917) was an Austrian economist. He studied under Carl Menger, and taught at the University of Freiberg before moving to be professor of economics at the University of Vienna in 1893. His textbook Grundriss der politischen Oekonomie was "the most successful German-language textbook on economics" of its time: the first volume went through 19 editions, selling over 63,000 copies.

Works
 Die Bank von England im dienste der finanzverwaltung des staates, 1885. Translated by Christabel Meredith as History of the Bank of England and its financial services to the State, 1911.
 (ed.) Auswanderung und Auswanderungspolitik in Deutschland : Berichte über die Entwicklung und den gegenwärtigen Zustand des Auswanderungswesens in den Einzelstaaten und im Reich [Emigration and Emigration Policy in Germany: Reports on the Development and the Current State of Emigration in the States and in the Reich]. 1892.
 Grundriss der politischen oekonomie [Foundations of Political Economy], 1893
 Die Entwicklung der wirtschaftspolitischen Ideen im 19. Jahrhundert [The development of economic policy ideas in the nineteenth century], 1910.
 (ed.) Economic protectionism by Josef Grunzel, 1916.

References

1858 births
1917 deaths
Austrian economists